The ciliary muscle is an intrinsic muscle of the eye formed as a ring of smooth muscle in the eye's middle layer, uvea (vascular layer). It controls accommodation for viewing objects at varying distances and regulates the flow of aqueous humor into Schlemm's canal. It also changes the shape of the lens within the eye but not the size of the pupil which is carried out by the sphincter pupillae muscle and dilator pupillae.

Structure

Development
The ciliary muscle develops from mesenchyme within the choroid and is considered a cranial neural crest derivative.

Nerve supply

The ciliary muscle receives parasympathetic fibers from the short ciliary nerves that arise from the ciliary ganglion.  The parasympathetic postganglionic fibers are part of cranial nerve V1 (Nasociliary nerve of the trigeminal), while presynaptic parasympathetic fibers to the ciliary ganglia travel with the oculomotor nerve. The postganglionic parasympathetic innervation arises from the ciliary ganglion.

Presynaptic parasympathetic signals that originate in the Edinger-Westphal nucleus are carried by cranial nerve III (the oculomotor nerve) and travel through the ciliary ganglion via the postganglionic parasympathetic fibers which travel in the short ciliary nerves and supply the ciliary body and iris. Parasympathetic activation of the M3 muscarinic receptors causes ciliary muscle contraction. The effect of contraction is to decrease the diameter of the ring of ciliary muscle causing relaxation of the zonule fibers, the lens becomes more spherical, increasing its power to refract light for near vision.

The parasympathetic tone is dominant when a higher degree of accommodation of the lens is required, such as reading a book.

Function

Accommodation

The ciliary fibers have circular (Ivanoff), longitudinal (meridional) and radial orientations.

According to Hermann von Helmholtz's theory, the circular ciliary muscle fibers affect zonular fibers in the eye (fibers that suspend the lens in position during accommodation), enabling changes in lens shape for light focusing. When the ciliary muscle contracts, it pulls itself forward and moves the frontal region toward the axis of the eye.  This releases the tension on the lens caused by the zonular fibers (fibers that hold or flatten the lens). This release of tension of the zonular fibers causes the lens to become more spherical, adapting to short range focus.  Conversely, relaxation of the ciliary muscle causes the zonular fibers to become taut, flattening the lens, increasing the focal distance, increasing long range focus.  Although Helmholtz's theory has been widely accepted since 1855, its mechanism still remains controversial.  Alternative theories of accommodation have been proposed by others, including L. Johnson, M. Tscherning, and especially Ronald A. Schachar.

Trabecular meshwork pore size
Contraction and relaxation of the longitudinal fibers, which insert into the trabecular meshwork in the anterior chamber of the eye, cause an increase and decrease in the meshwork pore size, respectively, facilitating and impeding aqueous humour flow into the canal of Schlemm.

Clinical significance

Glaucoma
Open-angle glaucoma (OAG) and closed-angle glaucoma (CAG) may be treated by muscarinic receptor agonists (e.g., pilocarpine), which cause rapid miosis and contraction of the ciliary muscles, opening the trabecular meshwork, facilitating drainage of the aqueous humour into the canal of Schlemm and ultimately decreasing intraocular pressure.

History

Etymology
The word ciliary had its origins around 1685–1695.  The term cilia originated a few years later in 1705–1715, and is the Neo-Latin plural of cilium meaning eyelash.  In Latin, cilia means upper eyelid and is perhaps a back formation from supercilium, meaning eyebrow.  The suffix -ary originally occurred in loanwords from Middle English (-arie), Old French (-er, -eer, -ier, -aire, -er), and Latin (-ārius); it can generally mean "pertaining to, connected with", "contributing to", and "for the purpose of".  Taken together, cili(a)-ary pertains to various anatomical structures in and around the eye, namely the ciliary body and annular suspension of the lens of the eye.

Additional images

See also

 Accommodation reflex
 Cycloplegia
 Extraocular muscle
 Presbyopia

References

External links
 Lens, zonule fibers, and ciliary muscles—SEM 

Muscles of the head and neck
Human eye anatomy